Patrick Short may refer to:

 Patrick Short (fl. c. 1830), British-born religious leader
 Patrick Short (1859–1941), Queensland police commissioner

See also

Pat Shortt (1967–), Irish entertainer